William Shaw (June 9, 1926 - August 20, 2006) was an American-born yacht designer known for his long tenure at Pearson Yachts as their Chief Naval Architect.

Biography
Shaw was born in Providence, Rhode Island in 1926 and graduated from the United States Merchant Marine Academy of Kings Point, NY in 1947. He went on to serve in the US Navy during the Korean War.

After completing his tenure in the Navy, Bill was able to pursue his dream of yacht design.  He joined the renowned firm of Sparkman & Stephens Naval Architects and Marine Engineers (S&S) in October 1952 as a designer. In 1961, he became a manager of Products of Asia, and was the chief designer of the America’s Cup defender Columbia.

Shaw joined Pearson Yachts in 1964 as Chief Architect, eventually running the entire Pearson Yachts Division of Grumman. During his tenure, he and his team designed over 50 different sailboats and power boats. He spoke in 1999 with Steve Mitchell for Good Old Boat regarding his time at Pearson:

Tom Hazelhurst remarked, "Under Bill's tutelage, they built damn good boats. I'm not saying that because I was their advertising man, but because I bought two of their boats. The boats just don't break."

Shaw died of complications of Alzheimer’s disease on August 20, 2006. Shaw has had a lasting impact on the sailing community. The thousands of boats still sailing, some over 50 years old, are a testament to his design expertise.  During his tenure at Pearson Yachts he received numerous awards, and Pearson became a world-renowned leader in the boat-building industry for quality fiberglass cruising and racing sailboats.

Sailboat designs

References

External links 

American yacht designers
2006 deaths
1926 births
United States Merchant Marine Academy alumni